A net is a mesh of strings or ropes or a device made from one, such as those used for fishing.

Net or net may also refer to:

Mathematics and physics 
 Net (mathematics), a filter-like topological generalization of a sequence
 Net, a linear system of divisors of dimension 2
 Net (polyhedron), an arrangement of polygons that can be folded up to form a polyhedron
 An incidence structure consisting of points and parallel classes of lines
 Operator algebras in Local quantum field theory
 ε-net (computational geometry), a mathematical concept whereby a general set is approximated by a collection of simpler subsets

Others 
 In computing, the Internet
 Net (textile), a textile in which the warp and weft yarns are looped or knotted at their intersections
 net sports, sports that use a net
 Net (economics) (nett), the sum or difference of two or more economic variables
 Net income (nett), an entity's income minus cost of goods sold, expenses and taxes for an accounting period
 In electronic design, a connection in a netlist
 In golf, the net score is the number of strokes taken minus any handicap allowance
 Net (command), an operating system command
 Net (film), 2021 Indian thriller drama film

See also 
 NET (disambiguation)
 Nett, a municipality in the Federated States of Micronesia
 .net (disambiguation)
 Network (disambiguation)